Hana Sofia Lopes (born March 5, 1990) is a Luxembourger-Portuguese actress born in the Grand Duchy of Luxembourg.

Biography 
Hana Sofia was born and raised in Luxembourg, to Portuguese parents.

After her high school degree at the Athénée de Luxembourg, she studied at the Lisbon Theatre and Film School, from which she graduated in 2012. As part of the Erasmus Programme, she performed a one-year university exchange at the Royal Academy of Dramatic Art in Madrid (RESAD), Spain in 2011.

She then studied at the Conservatoire national supérieur d'art dramatique, France's National Drama Academy in Paris, in the classes of Daniel Mesguich, Sandy Ouvrier and French choreographer Caroline Marcadé, among others.

During a performance of the Marriage of Figaro at the Paris Drama Academy in 2014, film director Marco Serafini sees her performance on stage and decides to cast her in the leading female role in Toy Gun, a feature film that he is then developing. In this film, she plays the leading female role alongside John Hannah, Anthony LaPaglia and Julian Sands. Her performance in this film has landed her a Best Actress nomination at the Luxembourg Film Awards, the Lëtzebuerger Filmpräis, in 2018.

In 2017, she made an appearance in the German TV series Bad Banks directed by German director Christian Schwochow. The series was broadcast on ARTE and German broadcaster Zdf. This show marks Hana's first performance in a German-language project.

Subsequently, she played a Spanish anarchist in the Belgian-Spanish film Escapada directed by Sarah Hirtt. Spanish actors Sergi López and María León are also part of the cast.

In 2017 she was part of the cast of Arthur Miller's The Crucible, directed by the English director Douglas Rintoul. The premiere took place at Queen's Theater, Hornchurch in London. In 2018, she played the lead role in the French play Intranquillités, based on the Book of Disquiet by Portuguese author Fernando Pessoa, staged in Luxembourg.

In 2018, she starred alongside Juliette Lewis and Henry Rollins in the Canadian film Dreamland directed by Bruce McDonald.

Meanwhile, she has also built a career in Portugal. Her roles in the prime time TV series Mar Salgado (2015) and Coração d'Ouro (2016), co-produced by TV Globo and viewed daily by nearly 2 million viewers, have made her well known to audiences in Portugal.  In 2017, she played queen Elizabeth of Aragon, the queen of Portugal in the historical series Ministério do Tempo broadcast on RTP.

Since 2020 she has been part of various plays in National Theatres all over Europe: Hedda Gabler in French at the Grand Theatre de Luxembourg, Medea in English at the Grand Theatre de Luxembourg, The lost beginning in Portuguese at the São João National Theatre in Porto. Furthermore, since was on a two year tour through France with the theatre play Habiter le temps with french actors Irene Jacob, Jérôme Kircher directed by Michel Didym. This play was performed in France’s major National Theatres: théâtre des Célestins in Lyon, théâtre Anthéa in Antibes, Châteauvallon-Liberté in Toulon, Opera-Théâtre in Metz, among others.  

She speaks French, German, English, Portuguese, Luxemburgish, Spanish and Italian.

Filmography

Film 

 2010 : My Eyes have Seen You (short) directed by Miguel Leao : Greta
 2013 : Someday (short) directed by Vito Labalestra : Alicia
 2014 : Amour fou directed by Jessica Hausner : the older sister
 2015 : Ouni Mooss (court) directed by Adolf El Assal : Alice
 2016 : The survivors directed by Luc Jabon : Lena
 2019 : Toy Gun directed by Marco Serafini : Giulia Redondini
 2019 : Escapade (Escapada) directed by Sarah Hirtt : Lola
 2019 : Dreamland directed by Bruce McDonald : Colero
 2022: Le retour de la jeunesse de Marcello Merletto et Fabio Bottani: Nilde
 2022 : Melusina directed by Whitney Fortmueller: Melusina
 2022: E.A.F. directed by Lucie Wahl: Rapha 
 2023: La bête qui sommeille en nous directed by Jonathan Becker: Violette 
 2023: Kanaval directed by Henri Pardo: Justine
 2024 : Sexual Healing directed by Julien Temple : Ivy Keaton

Screen 

 2012 : The Simpsons (voice-over Luxembourgish version) : Lindsey Naegle (1 episode)
 2012 : Weemseesdet: Carla (4 episodes) 
 2012-2013 : Comeback : Samantha (12 episodes)
 2013-2014 : Os Filhos do Rock : Carla (2 episodes)
 2015 : Mar Salgado : Camila (17 episodes)
 2015-2016 : Coração d'Ouro : Adriana (300 episodes)
 2017 : Bad Banks : Lola (1 episode)
 2017 : Ministério do tempo : the Queen of Portugal (1 episode)
 2018 : Zëmmer ze verlounen : Sophie (12 episodes)
 2019: GZSZ : Amalia  (3 episodes)
 2022: Capitani 2: Maria  - NETFLIX  (6 episodes)

Stage 

 2010 : Three Sisters by Anton Chekhov
 2010 : Phoenissae by Seneca 
 2011 : Auto da barca do inferno by Gil Vicente
 2011 : Twelfth Night by William Shakespeare 
 2011 : Peanuts by Fausto Paravidino
 2012 : Que formidable burdel! by Eugène Ionesco
 2012 : Por el torno y el sótano by Tirso de Molina
 2014 : Légendes de la forêt viennoise by Ödön von Horváth
 2014 : The Marriage of Figaro by Beaumarchais
 2017 : The Crucible by Arthur Miller 
 2018 : The Book of Disquiet by Fernando Pessoa
 2019 : Dealing with Clair by Martin Crimp
2020: Hedda Gabler by Henrik Ibsen
2020: Habiter le temps by Rasmus  Lindberg
2021: The lost beginning by Pedro Beja
2022: Medea by Euripides
2022: Hedda Gabler by Henrik Ibsen - Tour
2022: Habiter le temps by Rasmus Lindberg directed by  Michel Didym - Tour
2023: Menina do mar by Sophia de Mello Breyner directed by Rita Reis 
2023: Café Terminus directed by Frank Hoffmann

References

External links 
 

Living people
1990 births
People from Luxembourg City
Luxembourgian film actresses
Luxembourgian television actresses
Luxembourgian people of Portuguese descent
Portuguese film actresses
Portuguese television actresses
Portuguese stage actresses
Lisbon Theatre and Film School alumni
Conservatoire de Paris alumni
Alumni of the Athénée de Luxembourg
21st-century Luxembourgian actresses